Kurus may refer to:

Kuruş, the Turkish currency
Kuru (kingdom), the Indian kingdom
 Kūruš, Persian form of the name of Cyrus the Great

See also
Kuru (disambiguation)